Ilmar Raag (born 21 May 1968 in Kuressaare) is an Estonian media executive, actor, screenwriter and film director, best known for his socio-critical film The Class. He has served as CEO of Estonian Television from 2002 to 2005. He is a well known columnist in many prestigious Estonian newspapers (Postimees, Eesti Päevaleht). He has written many scripts and directed critically acclaimed films, notably August 1991 and The Class.

Life 
Raag was born in Kuressaare on 21 May 1968. He received his high school education from Aleksander Mui (:et) secondary school No 2 of Kingissepa. He graduated from University of Tartu in 1997 and received his M.A. degree in screenwriting from Ohio University, the School of Telecommunications (1999). He made internships in Hollywood development departments (New Regency, Phoenix Pictures). His further career took him to the TV management. After being the Head of Acquisitions for Estonian National Television, he was promoted to the Chairman of the Board of the same TV company. In 2002, he staged a play in one of the Estonian theaters (Ugala). At the same time, he started to consult and doctor Estonian feature scripts. In 2004, he wrote two TV feature scripts. He directed one of them  - August 1991 as made-for-TV movie for Estonian Television and the other, One More Croissant got the third prize at Hartley Merill International Screenwriting Competition and the support from MEDIA New Talent program.

Eager to continue his filmmaking career, he quit as CEO of Estonian Television and made his first feature film The Class in 2007. Since then he shot a feature in France Une Estonienne à Paris with Jeanne Moreau and Laine Mägi in leading roles, back in Estonia Kertu that was released in 2013 and in Russia I Won't Come Back.

Currently he is developing new projects with producer Riina Sildos from Amrion (Estonia).

Filmography

Director
 2022 Erik Kivisüda (aka Erik Stoneheart)
 2014 I Won't Come Back
 2015–2017 Vaba mehed (television series)
 2013 Kertu (aka Love Is Blind)
 2012 Une Estonienne à Paris (aka A Lady in Paris)
 2007 Klass (The Class)
 2005 August 1991 (television film)
 1998 Tappev Tartu (Killing Tartu) (amateur film)

Writer
 2013 Kertu
 2012 Une Estonienne à Paris
 2010 Klass: Elu pärast (television miniseries)
 2010 September (documentary)
 2008 Mina olin siin (I Was Here)
 2007 Klass (The Class)
 2006 Vana daami visiit 
 2005 Libahundi needus (television film)
 2005 August 1991 (television film)
 1998 Tappev Tartu (Killing Tartu) (amateur film)

Actor
 2010 Klass: Elu pärast (television miniseries)
 2008 Tuulepealne maa (television series)
 2006 Tabamata ime
 2005 Stiilpidu (aka Shop of Dreams)
 2005 Kohtumine tundmatuga (television film)
 2004 Visions of Europe (segment "Estonia: Euroflot")
 2003 Viimane öö (Short)
 1998 Tappev Tartu (Killing Tartu) (amateur film)
 1997 Minu Leninid (aka All My Lenins)

References

External links

1968 births
Living people
Estonian film directors
Estonian screenwriters
Estonian male film actors
People from Kuressaare
Recipients of the Order of the White Star, 4th Class